Maayan Furman-Shahaf (born November 9, 1986) is an Israeli high jumper and triple jumper.

She competed for Israel at the 2013 World Championships in Athletics in the women's high jump, coming in fifth at 1.88 m. She represented her country at the European Athletics Championships in 2012 and 2016.

National titles
Israeli Athletics Championships
High jump: 2007, 2009, 2012, 2013, 2014, 2015, 2016

References

External links 
 
 

1986 births
Living people
Israeli female high jumpers
Israeli female triple jumpers
World Athletics Championships athletes for Israel
Athletes (track and field) at the 2015 European Games
European Games medalists in athletics
European Games bronze medalists for Israel